or  is the highest point of Jetnamfjellet, a mountain on the border of the municipalities of Røyrvik (Trøndelag county) and Hattfjelldal (Nordland county) in Norway.

Name
The first element is from the Southern Sami language word "jitneme" which means "area covered with snow", and the last element is the finite form of Norwegian language word "klump" which means "clump" or "round mountain".

See also
 List of highest points of Norwegian counties

References

Mountains of Nordland
Mountains of Trøndelag
Røyrvik
Hattfjelldal